"The Trouble with Love Is" is a song by American singer-songwriter Kelly Clarkson, for her debut studio album Thankful (2003). The song was written by Clarkson with its producers Evan Rogers and Carl Sturken. It was released as the fourth and final single from the album, being first serviced to US contemporary hit radio on November 10, 2003. "The Trouble with Love Is" is an R&B and soul ballad, with elements of gospel music in its chorus. Lyrically, the song finds Clarkson explaining how love can be joyful and sorrowful at the same time. It received mostly positive reviews from music critics, who praised it for being "soulful" and "romantic", while also praising Clarkson's vocals, comparing them to those of Mariah Carey and Beyoncé.

Commercially, while failing to match "Miss Independent" success on the charts in the United States, the song performed considerably better internationally, reaching number 11 and a gold status in Australia, while also reaching significant positions in other three countries, including Canada and the United Kingdom. The song also served to promote the Christmas romantic comedy Love Actually (2003), being featured in its accompanying soundtrack. The music video for the song was directed by Bryan Barber and released on November 7, 2003. It features scenes from the film, while Clarkson performs the track on a rooftop. Clarkson performed the track during her Independent Tour (2004) and Breakaway World Tour (2005).

Composition and lyrics 
"The Trouble with Love Is" was written by Kelly Clarkson with its producers Carl Sturken and Evan Rogers. Sturken was also responsible for drum programming and keyboards, while Rogers provided background vocals with Cindy Mizelle. The song was recorded at four different studios: The Hit Factory, New York City; The Record Plant, Los Angeles; The Enterprise, Burbank, California; and The Loft Recording Studio, Bronxville, New York. Its strings were recorded at a different studio: The Studio, Philadelphia. The song features drums, violins, violas, cellos, keyboards and strings in its instrumentation. According to the sheet music published at Musicnotes.com by Kobalt Music Group, the song is written in the key of F major with a tempo of 60 beats per minute in common time. The song follows a chord progression of F – A7 – B – D - B, and Clarkson's vocals span from the low-note of B3 to the high note of F5. "The Trouble with Love Is" is an R&B and soul song, with elements of gospel throughout the chorus. Lyrically, it talks about the ups and downs of romance, with Clarkson singing, "Love may be a many splendored thing ... [But] it can tear you up inside/ Make your heart believe a lie."

Release and reception 
Following the release of "Low", which maintained her strong-hold on stateside fans, "The Trouble with Love Is" was announced as the album's third and final single, though there were fans who pant for the ballad "Anytime" to be released. It was first serviced to US mainstream radio on November 10, 2003, in the United States, and later released as a double A-side single with "Low" in the United Kingdom on November 17, 2003. It was released in the remaining countries on January 12, 2004. The song was also featured on the soundtrack of the 2003 film Love Actually.

Critical 
The song received positive reviews from most music critics. Stephen Thomas Erlewine of AllMusic picked the song as one of the best tracks on the album, while Heather Phares of the same publication praised the track for "manag[ing] to be romantic, sassy, and empowering all at once, with her vocals reflecting their urban ballad surroundings." Chuck Taylor of Billboard wrote a positive review, noting that Clarkson "mines her soulful side and riffs like a sista with the gospel-drenched [track]." Caroline Sullivan of The Guardian praised the singer, writing that "[l]ike her fellow Texan Beyoncé, she has a background in the church, and it shows in the phrasing of the torchy song." Sal Cinquemani of Slant Magazine called the song a "durable soul number reminiscent of Mariah Carey's 'Vision of Love'. A writer of the website Sputnikmusic named it a "swooning, soulful, radiant song, with gospel-esque background vocals in the chorus that stands out amongst most pop music that plagues the music scene today with mediocrity." Mike Wass of Idolator described it as "a bluesy ballad that is an early preview of the diva’s eventual flirtation with roots and blues."

Commercial 
While failing to match "Miss Independent" in the United States, "The Trouble with Love Is" performed considerably better internationally. In Australia, the song debuted at number 12 on February 22, 2004, while the next week it reached a peak of number 11 on the ARIA Charts week of February 29, 2004, remaining at the peak position for a further week. It matched the same peak position of the previous single, "Low", and ultimately, the song was certified gold by the Australian Recording Industry Association for selling over 35,000 copies. In Netherlands, the song peaked higher than her previous single, "Miss Independent", debuting at number 81, on December 27, 2003, and reaching number 26, on January 24, 2004. In Switzerland, the song became Clarkson's lowest charting-single of her career, peaking at number 62. In the United States, "The Trouble with Love Is" did not chart on the Billboard Hot 100 chart, but made its appearance on three Billboard component charts: the Top 40 Mainstream chart, where it peaked at number 22, the Adult Top 40, reaching number 31, and the Top 40 Tracks, where it reached number 36. On the Canadian Hot 100, the song performed significantly at number 25.

Music video 
The music video for the song was directed by Bryan Barber and premiered on November 7, 2003, on TRL. The video features Clarkson performing the track on a rooftop in downtown Los Angeles, with people watching Love Actually on a rooftop adjacent to the one Clarkson's on. As noted by MTV News' Corey Moss, "along with the high-altitude shots, Barber also created several vignettes showing kids dealing with troubled relationships, which [were] interspersed with the performance footage. The scenes [took] place in the rooms of the building Kelly is performing on and include[s] a girl fighting for attention from her video-game addict boyfriend and another girl climbing on the fire escape after arguing with her mother."

Live performances 
Clarkson promoted the song with a handful of live performances, including The Ellen Show, Pop Idol, Today Live on Air, AOL Music, Smile and Popworld. Clarkson also performed the track on her Independent Tour (2004), Behind These Hazel Eyes Tour and last on The Breakaway Tour (2005-2006). In 2012, on her Stronger Tour, Clarkson performed the track on a medley with "Walk Away", "How I Feel" and "I Want You".

Track listings

UK CD single ("Low" / "The Trouble with Love Is")
 "Low" (video mix) – 3:29
 "The Trouble with Love Is" – 3:42
 "Respect" – 2:15
 "Low" (music video) – 3:28

European CD single
 "The Trouble with Love Is" – 3:42
 "(You Make Me Feel Like A) Natural Woman" – 2:26
 "A Moment Like This" – 3:49

Australian CD single
 "The Trouble with Love Is" – 3:42
 "The Trouble with Love Is" (MaUVe classic vocal mix) – 8:27
 "The Trouble with Love Is" (Bimbo Jones dub) – 6:06

Credits and personnel
Credits are adapted from the liner notes of Thankful.

Recording
 Recorded at The Hit Factory, New York City; The Record Plant, Los Angeles; The Enterprise, Burbank, California; The Loft Recording Studio, Bronxville, New York. 
 Strings recorded at The Studio, Philadelphia. 
 Mixed at The Hit Factory, New York City.

Personnel

 Kelly Clarkson – vocals, writing
 Carl Sturken – writing, production, drum programming, keyboards
 Evan Rogers – writing, production, background vocals
 Larry Gold – strings arrangement, conductor
 Steve Ferrera – drums
 Cindy Mizelle – background vocals
 James Cooper, III – cellos
 Jennie Lorenzo – cellos
 Andrea Derby – production coordination
 Al Hemberger – engineering
 J.D. Andrew – engineering
 Rich Balmer – engineering
 Dan Bucchi – engineering assistant

 Jun Ishizeki – engineering assistant
 Gordon Goss – engineering assistant
 Jeff Chestek – strings engineering
 Tony Maserati – mixing
 Brendan Kuntz – mixing assistant
 Matt Snedecor – mixing assistant
 Alexandra Leem – viola
 Peter Nocella – viola
 Charlene Kwas – violin
 Charles Parker Jr. – violin
 Emma Kummrow – violin
 Gregory Teperman – violin
 Igor Szwec – violin

Charts

Weekly charts

Year-end charts

Certifications

Release history

References

19 Recordings singles
2000s ballads
2003 singles
2003 songs
Kelly Clarkson songs
Music videos directed by Bryan Barber
RCA Records singles
Songs about heartache
Songs about loneliness
Songs written by Carl Sturken and Evan Rogers
Songs written by Kelly Clarkson
Soul ballads
Syco Music singles